El Florido Flores is a Salvadoran Latin-American performer. In 2004, Flores released his debut album Aquí Estoy Yo... Arrastrando los Zapatos and the following year received a Lo Nuestro Award nomination for Tropical New Artist of the Year.

References

Living people
Year of birth missing (living people)
21st-century Salvadoran male singers